Carex sect. Ovales is a section of the genus Carex, containing around 85 species of sedge. It is the most diverse section of the genus in North America, containing 72 species:

Carex abrupta
Carex adusta
Carex alata
Carex albolutescens
Carex amplectens
Carex arapahoensis
Carex argyrantha
Carex athrostachya
Carex bebbii
Carex bicknellii
Carex brevior
Carex constanceana
Carex crawfordii
Carex cristatella
Carex cumulata
Carex davyi
Carex ebenea
Carex egglestonii
Carex festucacea
Carex feta
Carex foenea
Carex fracta
Carex gracilior
Carex harfordii
Carex haydeniana
Carex hormathodes
Carex hyalina
Carex illota
Carex integra
Carex leporina
Carex leporinella
Carex longii
Carex macloviana
Carex mariposana
Carex merritt-fernaldii
Carex microptera
Carex missouriensis
Carex molesta
Carex molestiformis
Carex multicostata
Carex muskingumensis
Carex normalis
Carex opaca
Carex oronensis
Carex ovalis, (nom. illeg. synonym   and )
Carex ozarkana
Carex pachystachya
Carex petasata
Carex phaeocephala
Carex praticola
Carex preslii
Carex projecta
Carex proposita
Carex reniformis
Carex scoparia
Carex shinnersii
Carex silicea
Carex specifica
Carex stenoptila
Carex straminea
Carex straminiformis
Carex subbracteata
Carex suberecta
Carex subfusca
Carex tahoensis
Carex tenera
Carex tetrastachya
Carex tincta
Carex tribuloides
Carex unilateralis
Carex vexans
Carex wootonii
Carex xerantica

References

Carex
Plant sections